Sceloporus melanogaster, the Central Plateau torquate lizard, is a species of lizard in the family Phrynosomatidae. It is endemic to Mexico.

References

Sceloporus
Endemic reptiles of Mexico
Reptiles described in 1885
Taxa named by Edward Drinker Cope